The 2022 Asian Women's U20 Volleyball Championship, referred to as the 2022 SMM Asian Women's U20 Volleyball Championship for sponsorship reasons, was the twentieth edition of the Asian Women's U20 Volleyball Championship, a biennial international volleyball tournament organised by the Asian Volleyball Confederation (AVC) with Kazakhstan Volleyball Federation (KVF) for the women's under-20 national teams of Asia. The tournament was held in Nur-Sultan, Kazakhstan, from 4 to 11 July 2022.

A total of nine teams played in the tournament, with players born on or after 1 January 2003 eligible to participate.

Same as previous editions, the tournament acted as the AVC qualifiers for the FIVB Volleyball Women's U21 World Championship. The top two teams qualified for the 2023 FIVB Volleyball Women's U21 World Championship, as the AVC representatives.

Qualification
The following teams qualified for the tournament.

Pools composition

Preliminary round

Pool A
All times are Kazakhstan Standard Time (UTC+06:00).

|}
 

 
 
 
 
|}

Pool B

|}
 

 
 
 
 
 
 
 
 
|}

Final round

5th–8th classification round

5th–8th semifinals 
 
 
|}

7th place match
  
|}

5th place match
  
|}

Final four

Semifinals 
 
 
|}

3rd place match
  
|}

Final
  
|}

Final standing

Awards

Most Valuable Player
 Anna Uemura
Best Setter
 Kaji Haruka
Best Outside Spikers
 Anna Uemura
 Wang Yifan

Best Middle Blockers
 Zhang Hongziyan
 Tunyapoo Nantikan
Best Opposite Spiker
 Yang Youkyung
Best Libero
 Amika Tokumoto

See also
2022 Asian Girls' U18 Volleyball Championship

References

2022
Asian U19 Championship
International volleyball competitions hosted by Kazakhstan
2022 in Kazakhstani sport
July 2022 sports events in Asia